Berrow may refer to:

Places
Berrow, Somerset
Berrow, Worcestershire

People with the surname
Capel Berrow (1716–1782), English divine

See also
Berrow Green
Berrow's Worcester Journal, a British newspaper established in 1690